The 2006 Peterborough City Council election took place on 4 May 2006 to elect members of Peterborough City Council in England. This was on the same day as other local elections.

Election result

References

2006
2000s in Cambridgeshire
Peterborough